Papilio menestheus, the western emperor swallowtail, is a species of swallowtail butterfly from the genus Papilio that is found in Senegal, Guinea-Bissau, Guinea, Sierra Leone, Liberia Ivory Coast, Ghana, Togo, Nigeria, Cameroon and Equatorial Guinea.

The larvae feed on Citrus species and Fagara macrophylla.

Taxonomy
Papilio menestheus is the nominal member of the menestheus species group. The members of the clade are:
Papilio menestheus Drury, 1773 
Papilio lormieri  Distant, 1874 
Papilio ophidicephalus  Oberthür, 1878

Subspecies
Papilio menestheus menestheus (Senegal, Guinea-Bissau, Guinea, Sierra Leone, Liberia, Ivory Coast, Ghana, Togo, Nigeria, western Cameroon)
Papilio menestheus canui Gauthier, 1984 (Equatorial Guinea)

References

menestheus
Butterflies described in 1773
Butterflies of Africa
Taxa named by Dru Drury